Mulleneaux is a surname. Notable people with the surname include:
 Carl Mulleneaux (1914–1995), American football player
 Lee Mulleneaux (1908–1985), American football player